Epsilon Muscae, Latinized as ε Muscae, is a red giant star of spectral type M5III in the constellation Musca. Originally a main-sequence star of around 1.5 to 2 solar masses, it is now on the asymptotic giant branch and has now expanded to 130 times the Sun's diameter and 1800 to 2300 its luminosity. It is a semiregular variable, varying in eight distinct periods ranging from a month to over half a year in length, with the largest amplitude being of almost half a magnitude from the mean of 4.06. It is located around 300 light-years distant, the same distance as the Lower Centaurus–Crux subgroup of the Scorpius–Centaurus association, although it is moving much faster at around 100 km/s and does not share a common origin.

References

M-type giants
Asymptotic-giant-branch stars
Semiregular variable stars
Musca (constellation)
Muscae, Epsilon
Durchmusterung objects
106849
059929
4671